Charles A. "Chuck" Moseley is a Democratic member of the Indiana House of Representatives, representing the 10th District since 2009.

References

External links
Indiana State Legislature - Representative Chuck Moseley Official government website
Profile at Project Vote Smart
Follow the Money - Charles Moseley
2008 campaign contributions

Democratic Party members of the Indiana House of Representatives

Living people
People from Portage, Indiana
21st-century American politicians
Year of birth missing (living people)